Hailey Faith Whitters (born September 9, 1989) is an American country musician originally from Shueyville, Iowa.

Songwriting and music career 
Whitters has written songs  for Little Big Town, Alan Jackson, and has written with Lori McKenna. Whitters has toured with Little Big Town, and opened for Maren Morris on her 2019 Girl: The World Tour. 
Whitters released her debut full-length album in 2015 titled Black Sheep. Whitters co-wrote Little Big Town's song "Happy People", from their 2017 album The Breaker. On September 13, 2019, Whitters released an Extended play entitled "The Days", which serves as the first half of her upcoming album, "The Dream". On January 24, 2020, Whitters released a single called "Janice at the Hotel Bar", written with her frequent collaborator Lori McKenna. In June 2020, Whitters signed with Big Loud Records’ imprint Songs & Daughters.

Whitters' third album, Raised, was released on March 18, 2022. The album became her first album to reach the Billboard charts, debuting at #18 on the Heatseekers Albums chart and staying on the chart for 6 weeks, later hitting a peak of #9. Raised was preceded by the release of songs "Everything She Ain't" and "The Neon". The former would go on to be released to country radio in June 2022. To support the album, Whitters embarked on The Heartland Tour, as well as supported Jon Pardi's Ain't Always The Cowboy Tour during the summer of 2022.

Discography

Studio albums

Singles

Awards and nominations

References

American women country singers
American country singer-songwriters
Country musicians from Iowa
Living people
1989 births
People from Johnson County, Iowa
21st-century American women
Singer-songwriters from Iowa